The University of Damascus (Jāmi‘atu Dimashq) is the largest and oldest university in Syria, located in the capital Damascus and has campuses in other Syrian cities. It was founded in 1923 through the merger of the School of Medicine (established 1903) and the Institute of Law (established 1913). Until 1958, it was named the Syrian University, but the name changed after the founding of the University of Aleppo.

Damascus University was one of the most reputable universities in the Arab World before the war in Syria started in 2011.

The University of Damascus consists of several faculties, higher Institutes, intermediate institutes and a school of nursing. One of the institutions specializes in teaching the Arabic language to foreigners, which is the largest institution of its kind in the Arab world.

History

In 1901, the establishment of the Office of the School of Medicine in Damascus was approved and in 1903 this school, which is the nucleus of the university, opened. The school included branches in medicine and pharmacy, and the language of instruction was Turkish.

In 1913, a Law School opened in Beirut, in which most of the teachers were Arabs and the language of instruction was Arabic. Then this school was transferred to Damascus in 1914 just as the School of Medicine moved to Beirut. Then in the last years of the First World War the Law School returned to Beirut.

Following that the Institute of Medicine and the School of Law opened in Damascus, the former at the beginning of January in 1919 and the latter in September of the same year.

In 1923, the School of Law was named the Institute of Law and this institute was linked together with the Institute of Medicine, the Arab Society, and the Center of Arabic Heritage in organization under the name of the Syrian University. Then the Arab Society and the Center of Arabic Heritage separated from the organization in 1926.

In 1928, the School of Higher Literary Studies was established and it immediately connected its administration with the university. In 1929 it became the School of Letters, which closed in 1935–1936.

Then starting in 1946, the university was no longer limited to the Institutes of Medicine and Law, but rather faculties and higher institutions were created in other subjects.

In 1958, a new law was created to regulate the universities in the northern and southern regions of the United Arab Republic. This led to changing the name of “the Syrian University” to “Damascus University” and to the creation of a second northern university called “the University of Aleppo.” 

In 1959, The College of Fine Arts was established in Damascus and became part of Damascus University in 1972.

Structure

Degrees Offered

Damascus University awards graduate (Master, Ph.D. Professional Training and Qualification) and undergraduate (Bachelor) degree programs. The period of study for the bachelor's degree ranges from 4 to 6 years, based on the need for each discipline of study. The Master programs combine course work and research, and require a minimum of two years and a maximum  of a three. Under certain circumstances, an additional fourth year may be approved by a decision of the university council based on the recommendation of the faculty council. The Ph.D. degree is a fully research program. The period of research is not less than two years and not more than five years by the decision of the university council based on the recommendation of the faculty council. although some faculties -Like Faculty of Arts, English Literature Department- does not award Ph.D. degree.

Faculties

 Medicine: Founded in 1903. It is one of the top ten international providers of licensed physicians to the United States.
 Pharmacy: Founded in 1903.
 Dentistry: Founded in 1921.
 Information Technology: Founded in 1994.
 Civil Engineering: Founded in 1961.
 Mechanical Engineering & Electrical Engineering: Founded in 1963.
 Economics: Founded in 1956.
 Arts and Humanities: Founded in 1928.
 Education: Founded in 1946.
 Agriculture: Founded in 1963.
 Islamic Jurisprudence: Founded in 1954.
 Architecture: Founded in 1960.
 Sciences
 Fine Arts: Founded in 1960.
 Political Science: Founded in 1979.
 Law: Founded in 1913.
 Tourism

Higher institutes
 Higher Institute of Laser Research and Applications
 Higher Institute of Administrative Development
 Higher Institute of Seismologic Studies and Research
 Higher Institute of Languages
 Higher Institute of Translation and Interpretation
The Arabic Language Institute at the University of Damascus is recognized as the best center to study Arabic for non-native speakers in the world.  The Center for Arabic Study abroad, the premier U.S. organization for Arabic study, is now opening a second branch at the university.  The Arabic Language Institute at the University of Damascus is known for immersion instruction in Arabic, allowing more rapid, natural and comprehensive language acquisition. The Arabic Language Institute's faculty is committed to classical Arabic instruction, offering an advantage to either Egypt or Jordan where much instruction is conducted in the local dialect.

Technical institutes
The duration of the study is two years, when the graduate students receive a diploma from the institute itself according to the jurisdiction of their choice.
 Technical Institute of Business Administration and Marketing: with the following disciplines: Business Administration – Marketing – Public Relations.
 Technical Institute of Finance and Banking Sciences: (formerly known as the "Commercial Institute", offers associate degrees in the following disciplines: Accounting – financial markets – banking studies. The best students are offered the opportunity to continue their education at the Faculty of Economics.)
 Technical Institute of Medicine
 Technical Institute of Dentistry
 Technical Institute of Engineering
 Technical Institute of Mechanical Engineering and electricity
 Technical Institute of Computer Science
 Technical Institute of Agricultural studies

On 13 November 2012, the President Bashar al-Assad  issued a decree on establishing a branch for Damascus University in Quneitra, a city in the Syrian Heights.

Open Learning
The Open Learning Center offers degrees in three majors:
 Legal studies
 Computer and informatics
 Minor and intermediate projects
 English language

Library
The University of Damascus Library began in 1903 (with the establishment of the Medical Bureau). As of 2011 it contains some 169,000 volumes and 3,830 current periodicals.

University hospitals

The university runs eight hospitals in the city of Damascus:
 Al Assad University Hospital
 Al Mouwasat University Hospital
 Obstetrics & Gynecology University Hospital
 Cardiac Surgery University Hospital
 Dermatology & Venereal Diseases University Hospital
 Children's University Hospital
 Al Bairouni University Hospital
 Oral Maxillofacial Surgery Hospital

Career guidance and capabilities building centers
 Business Clinics (Shabab-Damascus)

Logo
The emblem of Damascus University reflects the importance of science and endless desire of human for knowledge, as well as the privacy of Damascus in development of science and scientists.

The color of raspberry stands for the damascene raspberry which is a fruit found only in Damascus, expressing the uniqueness of the university just like the fruit. The color is adopted for the signature of the president of Damascus University, a property not shared with any president of any university in the world.

The lamp is the symbol of knowledge in different cultures, it radiates the light of knowledge and science, crowned with a verse from the Quran: "say oh my Lord, increase me in knowledge", which is the motto of Damascus University and its non-stop seeking.

Notable alumni

Al-Assad family 

 Khaled al-Asaad –  archaeologist and the head of antiquities at the ancient city of Palmyra
 Muhammad al-Yaqoubi –  Islamic scholar and religious leader
 Rasha Abbas – author and journalist
 Rashad Barmada – served as deputy prime minister of Syria and minister of defense 
 Giles Clarke – chairman of the England and Wales Cricket Board
 Colette Khoury – novelist
 Dina Katabi – Professor in the Department of Electrical Engineering and Computer Science at MIT and the director of the MIT Wireless Center
 Gyorgy Busztin – Hungarian Ambassador and U.N. Deputy Special Representative
 Sa'id al-Afghani – Professor and Dean of the Faculty of Arts
 Abdelsalam al-Majali – former Prime Minister of Jordan
 Riad Ismat – diplomat, writer and theatrical director
 George Percy, Earl Percy – British businessman and heir apparent to the Dukedom of Northumberland
 Nizar Qabbani –  poet, author and diplomat, B.A. in Law
 Abbas al-Noury –  actor, author, director and TV presenter, B.A. in History
 Duraid Lahham –  actor, author, Director and TV presenter, B.Sc. in Chemistry and Physics
 Farouk al-Sharaa – politician and diplomat, Syrian Vice President, B.A. in English Literature
 Aref Dalila – economist and politician, B.Sc. in Economics
 Ali Farzat – caricaturist and painter, B.A. in Fine Arts
 Ibrahim Mughrabi – football striker, studied law before moving to Greece to continue his studies
 Georges Tarabichi –  writer
 Riad Barmada –  Syrian-American orthopedics surgeon, 
 Imran Raza Ansari – politician, Shia cleric and cabinet minister in Jammu & Kashmir
 Louay Kayali –  artist
 Marwan Kassab-Bachi – German painter of Syrian origin
 Abdul Halim Khaddam – Vice President of Syria and "High Commissioner" to Lebanon from 1984 to 2005
 Moustapha Akkad – Syrian American film producer and director
 Nazim al-Qudsi – former President of Syria 
 Nureddin al-Atassi – former President of Syria
 Mahmoud Zuabi – Prime Minister of Syria from 1987 to 2000
 Muhammad Mustafa Mero – Prime Minister of Syria from 2000 to 2003
 Bashir al-Azma – Prime Minister of Syria and later a Minister in the United Arab Republic (UAR)
 Farouk al-Sharaa – foreign minister of Syria from 1984 until 2006 when he became Vice President
 Georges Sabra – president of the Syrian National Council
 Haitham al-Maleh – human rights activist and former judge and one of the most important opposition figures in Syria
 Shadia Habbal – Syrian-American astronomer and physicist
 Ghada al-Samman – writer, journalist and novelist
 Omar Alghabra – Member of the Parliament of Canada
 Sadiq Jalal al-Azm – Professor of Modern European Philosophy
 Ghassan Kanafani – Palestinian author and  member of the Popular Front for the Liberation of Palestine (PFLP)
 Sirin Hamsho –  engineer and inventor
 Khalid Bakdash – leader of the Syrian Communist Party and the "dean of Arab communism"
 Akram al-Hawrani – One of the founders of Ba'ath Party and vice-president of the United Arab Republic
 Omar Bakri Muhammad – Salafi Islamist militant leader
 Kenan Yaghi,  Finance Minister of Syria

Gallery

References

External links
 
 

 
Educational institutions established in 1923
Buildings and structures in Damascus
1923 establishments in Mandatory Syria
Libraries in Syria
Universities in Syria